Joe Hayes (20 January 1936 – 1 February 1999) was an English footballer who played as an inside forward for Manchester City, Barnsley and Wigan Athletic. Alongside Francis Lee, he's tied as the second highest goalscorer in the Manchester derby. Hayes is also Man City's fifth highest goal scorer of all time.

Career 
Hayes was born in Kearsley, near Bolton, Lancashire in 1936, and worked in a cotton mill and a coal mine prior to becoming a footballer. In August 1953 he had a trial with Manchester City, and made his debut two months later against Tottenham. The teenage Hayes appeared in the 1955 FA Cup Final, but finished on the losing side. 12 months later Manchester City reached the final again, and Hayes scored the first goal in a 3–1 win. Hayes was a regular goalscorer in the late 1950s and early 1960s, until a knee injury occurring in September 1963 had a noticeable effect on his abilities, after which first team opportunities became limited. He was transferred to Barnsley in the 1965 close season, and later went on to play for Wigan Athletic, appearing 32 times and scoring seven goals for the club. In total, Hayes scored 152 goals in 363 appearances for Manchester City, making him the fifth highest Manchester City goalscorer of all time.

Personal life 
Hayes died in 1999 at the age of 63.

Honours

As a player

Manchester City F.C.

 FA Cup winner 1956

References

 David Clayton, Everything Under the Blue Moon (Mainstream Publishing, 2002).
 Gary James, Manchester: The Greatest City (Polar Publishing, 2002).

External links
 Career statistics

1936 births
1999 deaths
English footballers
England under-23 international footballers
Manchester City F.C. players
Barnsley F.C. players
Wigan Athletic F.C. players
People from Kearsley
Association football forwards
FA Cup Final players